Union Springs Academy is a private, co-ed Seventh-day Adventist prep school in Union Springs in Cayuga County, New York.  It is a part of the Seventh-day Adventist education system, the world's second largest Christian school system. At USA the acceptance rate is about 95 percent, leaving the population of the student body to about seventy students. Over sixty percent of the school is involved in music, arts, and sports. The graduation rate at Union Springs Academy is 90 percent. Students from Union Springs Academy have been known to go to universities around the United States and the world.  The teacher-to-student ratio is about 4:1, so every student is helped equally and fairly. The academy was started in 1921 when the Seventh-day Adventist church purchased the buildings and land from the Seminary of Friends.

The current principal is Jere Clayburn.

History
It was founded by the New York Conference of Seventh-day Adventists in 1921, and sits on a hill overlooking the village of Union Springs, New York. The academy traces its roots to various “home-schools” which began in western and central New York in 1901. USA is situated on a hill overlooking Cayuga Lake, the largest of the Finger Lakes. The present school campus was formerly a Quaker boarding school known as Oakwood Seminary. Over the years the campus has grown to include buildings for administration and classrooms, dormitories, church, faculty housing, farm, orchard and athletic facilities.

Academics
The required curriculum includes classes in the following subject areas: Religion, English, Oral Communications, Social Studies, Mathematics, Science, Physical Education, Health, Computer Applications, Fine Arts, and Electives.

Spiritual aspects
All students take religion classes each year that they are enrolled. These classes cover topics in biblical history and Christian and denominational doctrines. Instructors in other disciplines also begin each class period with prayer or a short devotional thought, many which encourage student input. Weekly, the entire student body gathers together in the auditorium for an hour-long chapel service.
Outside the classrooms there is year-round spiritually oriented programming that relies on student involvement.

Accreditation
Union Springs Academy is registered with the Board of Regents of the University of New York and accredited by the Accrediting Association of Seventh-day Adventist Schools, Colleges, and Universities which is a recognized member of the National Council for Private School Accreditation.

See also

 List of Seventh-day Adventist secondary schools
 Seventh-day Adventist education

References

External links
 

Adventist secondary schools in the United States
Boarding schools in New York (state)
Schools in Cayuga County, New York
Private high schools in New York (state)
Union Springs, New York